Group B of the 2017 FIFA Confederations Cup took place from 18 to 25 June 2017. It consisted of Cameroon, Chile, Australia, and Germany. The top two teams, Germany and Chile, advanced to the semi-finals.

Teams

Notes

Standings

In the semi-finals:
 The winners of Group B, Germany, advances to play the runners-up of Group A, Mexico.
 The runners-up of Group B, Chile, advances to play the winners of Group A, Portugal.

Matches
All times Moscow Time (UTC+3).

Cameroon vs Chile

Australia vs Germany

Cameroon vs Australia

Germany vs Chile

Germany vs Cameroon

Chile vs Australia

References

External links
 Official site
 Official Documents and Match Documents

2017 FIFA Confederations Cup